Cristian Porto Spricigo (born August 7, 1990), is a striker who plays for S.E.R. Guarani on loan from Avaí. He began his career in the youth teams of Atlético Paranaense in 2006, where he remained for that year only.

Career
He moved to the youth system of Avaí in 2007 and soon reached prominence in the club of Santa Catarina. By 2008,  he was integrated into the group's professional club where he played with the Avaí B team, Copa Santa Catarina. At the beginning of 2009,  he participated prominently in the campaign of Avaí in the Copa São Paulo de Futebol Júnior and participated in 13 games for the club in the Brazilian Championship, recording three goals in the competition.

For the 2010 season, became a primary weapon in Avaí to the state championship and national levels.

Career statistics
(Correct )

Honours
Atlético Paranaense
Campeonato Paranaense Juvenil: 2006

Avaí
Campeonato Catarinense: 2009, 2010

References

External links
 ogol.com
 Sambafoot

1990 births
Living people
Brazilian footballers
Avaí FC players
Association football forwards